Elmer Allen (born November 3, 1949) is a former Canadian football linebacker who played one game for the Montreal Alouettes of the Canadian Football League in 1972. He was selected by the Houston Oilers of the National Football League in the sixth round of the 1972 NFL Draft. Allen played college football at Mississippi College.

References 

1949 births
American football linebackers
Canadian football linebackers
Mississippi College Choctaws football players
Houston Oilers players
Montreal Alouettes players
Players of Canadian football from Louisiana
Players of American football from Louisiana
Living people
People from Delhi, Louisiana